Hasan Doğan Piker (born July 25, 1991), also known as HasanAbi (abi meaning big brother in Turkish), is a Turkish-American Twitch streamer and left-wing political commentator. He has previously worked as a broadcast journalist and producer at The Young Turks and as a columnist at HuffPost. He is currently one of the most-viewed and most-subscribed-to streamers on Twitch, where he covers news, plays a variety of video games, and discusses politics from a socialist perspective. HasanAbi became the most watched creator in the U.S. in 2022, accumulating almost 81.6 million hours watched.

Early life
Hasan Doğan Piker was born to Turkish parents in New Brunswick, New Jersey, and raised in Istanbul. He says he was bullied during his time in public school in Turkey for his lack of physical fitness and questioning attitude towards Islam.

Piker returned to the United States and attended the University of Miami, then transferred to Rutgers University, where he graduated cum laude with a double major in political science and communication studies in 2013.

Career

The Young Turks
During his senior year of college in 2013, Piker interned for The Young Turks (TYT), a progressive news show and network co-founded by his uncle, Cenk Uygur. After graduating, Piker was hired by the network's ad sales and business department. He asked to host the show when a fill-in was needed, and later became a host and producer. Uygur described his nephew as "magnetic" though "rough around the edges" at first.

In 2016, Piker created and hosted The Breakdown, a TYT Network video series which aired on Facebook and presented left-leaning political analysis targeted at millennial supporters of Bernie Sanders. The show was nominated in the "Best Web Series" category at the 10th Shorty Awards in 2018. Piker also wrote political content for HuffPost from 2016 to 2018.

Piker created and hosted another TYT series in 2019 called Agitprop with Hasan Piker. In January 2020, he announced his departure from TYT and his intention to focus on his career as a Twitch streamer.

Twitch
Piker started streaming on Twitch in March 2018, while he was working at TYT. Piker has said he shifted his attention from Facebook to Twitch in order to reach a younger audience, and because of what he felt was a preponderance of right-wing commentators on YouTube and a lack of leftist representation among streamers. He became a popular left-wing political commentator, invited to appear on Fox News's The Issue Is and the political podcast Chapo Trap House. His YouTube channel features highlights of his streams, and in 2022 reached over 1,000,000 subscribers. Piker also streams gameplay and commentary of video games on his Twitch channel. Sometimes when playing video games, Piker will role-play as "Hank Pecker", a caricature of right-wing redneck.

During the first 2020 United States presidential debate on September 29, Piker had over 125,000 viewers watching his commentary of the broadcast, the highest viewership of the debate on Twitch. On October 19, 2020, U.S. Representative Alexandria Ocasio-Cortez collaborated with Piker and fellow Twitch streamer Pokimane to organize a stream of the Representative playing popular multiplayer game Among Us for the "Get out the vote" initiative. The stream aired the following day, featuring both Ocasio-Cortez and U.S. Representative Ilhan Omar playing the game with Piker and many other popular Twitch streamers, reaching a total concurrent viewership of almost 700,000.

Piker's stream covering the results of the 2020 United States presidential election peaked at 230,000 concurrent viewers and was the sixth most-watched source of election coverage across YouTube and Twitch, comprising 4.9% of the market share. He was the most watched Twitch streamer during the election week; his 80 hours of streams were viewed for a cumulative 6.8 million hours by an average of 75,000 concurrent viewers. Piker's stream reached a new high of 231,000 viewers during the January 6 United States Capitol attack.

On November 8, 2021, Piker released a line of union-made merchandise and donated a portion of the proceedings to strike funds in which he raised over $180,000.

During the Russian invasion of Ukraine, Piker, in partnership with CARE, raised over $200,000 for Ukrainian relief funds while playing Elden Ring, with an average of over 70,000 people watching his coverage of the conflict.

In the aftermath of the February 6, 2023 Turkey–Syria earthquake, Piker organized a fundraiser that was also contributed to and promoted by other streamers and content creators including Jacksepticeye, Valkyrae, Ludwig Ahgren, and IShowSpeed. , the fundraiser had raised over $1,200,000 for charities such as Care International's Turkish and Syrian branches as well as two Turkish NGOs: the AKUT Search and Rescue Association, and Ahbap, which was founded by Turkish musician Haluk Levent.

Other ventures
Since 2021, Piker co-hosts the Fear& podcast alongside his friend and fellow Twitch streamer, Will Neff. On September 26, 2021, Piker became co-host on the h3h3Productions left-leaning political podcast Leftovers.

Political views 
Piker has been identified as a progressive, leftist, and a democratic socialist. He has advocated in favor of workplace democracy, universal health care, intersectional feminism, LGBTQ+ rights, and gun control; he has advocated against war, American imperialism, Islamophobia, white supremacy and capitalism.

Piker has cited his upbringing in Turkey under the Premiership of Recep Tayyip Erdoğan as an influence on both his left-wing views and willingness to speak out about them. Piker supported the presidential primary campaigns of Bernie Sanders in 2016 and 2020, and has been an outspoken critic of both the Democratic and Republican parties.

Controversies
During his stream on August 21, 2019, Piker criticized U.S. Representative Dan Crenshaw, a SEAL Team 3 veteran who served in Afghanistan, for his support of American military interventionism overseas. On Crenshaw, Piker said, "What the fuck is wrong with this dude? Didn’t he go to war and like literally lose his eye because some mujahideen, a brave fucking soldier fucked his eye hole with their dick?" In the same stream, Piker criticized American foreign policy and made controversial comments relating to the September 11 attacks, including "America deserved 9/11, dude." His statements caused outrage on social media and were covered by Fox News and various other media outlets. Crenshaw said that Piker's comments was a "disgusting defense of the 9/11 terrorist attacks against Americans." The Young Turks host and Piker's uncle Cenk Uygur called them "very offensive," and invited Piker to appear on TYT to apologize. Piker has defended his comments as satirical and cited the U.S.' foreign policy as promoting conditions to make an event like 9/11 possible, but acknowledged that he should have used "more precise" language. Twitch banned him for one week for the comments regarding Crenshaw and 9/11.

In August 2021, Piker purchased a $2.7 million house in West Hollywood, California. The purchase was criticized online by people who felt that his lavish lifestyle seemed to be in opposition to his views as a socialist. Similar criticism was aired in February 2022 after it emerged that Piker had purchased a Porsche Taycan. Piker has also been criticized after a large-scale information leak from Twitch, which included the financial earnings of Piker among many other streamers. He responded by stating that his earnings have always been transparent, as his subscriber count has continuously been prominently displayed on screen.

On December 13, 2021, Piker was banned from Twitch for one week for using the racial epithet "cracker" repeatedly on stream. Piker argued that the term should not be considered a slur since a person using it is "powerless" and they "are doing it as someone who has been historically oppressed blowing off steam." He further contended "cracker" is not a slur in the same way as other racial slurs, stating that "It's something I've talked about so many times because it's like white boys love fucking saying, 'Cracker is the same as the n-word,' It's really stupid. The etymology of the word is different. … It comes from 'whip cracker.' So the power is still in the hands of the white person in that situation, whereas the n-word is dehumanizing." However, the exact history and etymology of the word is still debated.

Reception 
Outlets dedicated to video game culture and youth culture have covered Piker's streams positively. In particular, journalists have noted his ability to "combine information and entertainment," and to approach left-wing political coverage in a way that is relatable and accessible to Twitch viewers, who may feel out of touch with cable news. Some authors also cite Piker's vulgar, animated style of expression and his physical appearance as notable factors behind his popularity.

Gaming website Kotaku selected Piker as one of their "Gamers of the Year" for 2020, citing him as a major figure in the mainstreaming of political commentary on Twitch, a platform which in the past was seen as discouraging to political discussion. Piker won a Streamy in the News category at the 10th annual awards in 2020, and was nominated again in the same category for the 2021 event. In 2022, Piker was nominated in the categories News, Just Chatting, and Streamer of the Year, winning the News award for the second time and being nominated for three consecutive years. At the event he also presented the Creator of the Year award alongside Avani Gregg, which was won by MrBeast for the third year in a row. At the 2023 Streamer Awards, Piker was nominated for Best Just Chatting Streamer and Streamer of the Year, winning the former.

Personal life
Piker was raised Muslim and is of Turkish descent. He is the nephew of Cenk Uygur, creator of The Young Turks. Piker currently resides in Los Angeles.

Awards and nominations

|-
|rowspan="2"|2018
|rowspan="2"|The Breakdown
|Web Series
|10th Shorty Awards
|
|rowspan="2"|
|
|-
|News & Information
|2018 Webby Awards
|
|
|-
|rowspan="2"|2020
|rowspan="10"|HasanAbi
|Like & Subscribe
|theScore esports Awards 2020
|
|
|
|-
|rowspan="2"|News
|10th Streamy Awards
|
|
|
|-
|2021
|11th Streamy Awards
|
|
|
|-
|rowspan="4"|2022
| Best Just Chatting Streamer
|The Streamer Awards
|
|
|
|-
|Streamer of the Year
|rowspan="3"|12th Streamy Awards
|
|
|rowspan="3"|
|-
|Just Chatting
|
|
|-
|News
|
|
|-
|rowspan="3"|2023
|Best Just Chatting Streamer
|rowspan="2"|The Streamer Awards
|
|
|rowspan="2"|
|-
| Streamer of the Year
|

Notes

References

External links

1991 births
American people of Turkish descent
American YouTubers
American political commentators
California socialists
HuffPost writers and columnists
Living people
Male feminists
Mass media people from Istanbul
People from New Brunswick, New Jersey
Progressivism in the United States
Rutgers University alumni
The Young Turks people
Twitch (service) streamers
University of Miami alumni
Turkish Muslims